Thomas Kirby Van Zandt (March 7, 1814 - January 2, 1886) was a painter active in the Albany, New York region. He is remembered for his paintings of race horses for owners including Leland Stanford, Erastus Corning, and Eli Whitney, but also painted bust-length portraits of Albany citizens, dogs, and other animals. It has been hypothesized (see Ione) that Van Zandt traced his horse figures from lantern projections of Eadweard Muybridge's celebrated photographs. Van Zandt is buried in the Albany Rural Cemetery in Menands, New York.

References 
 Art across America: two centuries of regional painting, 1710-1920, Volume 1, William H. Gerdts, Abbeville Press, Oct 15, 1990, page 176.
 America the beautiful: 19th & 20th century paintings from the Walter and Lucille Rubin collection, Boca Raton Museum of Art, 2003, page 181.
 Innovation and Visualization: Trajectories, Strategies, and Myths, Amy Ione, Rodopi, 2005, page 118. Volume 1 of Consciousness, literature & the arts, ISSN 1573-2193. .

Painters from New York (state)
1814 births
1886 deaths
Equine artists
Artists from Albany, New York
Burials at Albany Rural Cemetery